"Save the Day" is a song by Australian punk rock band The Living End, released in September 1998. It is the first official single taken from the band's self-titled album, following the release of the Second Solution / Prisoner of Society EP the previous year. The song spent 17 weeks in the Australian ARIA Singles Chart, peaking at No. 22, and reached No. 10 on Triple J's Hottest 100 for 1998. The single was later certified gold, selling in excess of 35,000 copies.

The single was also released on 7" vinyl, however it was a limited release with only 500 copies issued.

Track listing

Charts

Certifications

Release history

Personnel
The Living End
Chris Cheney – vocals, guitar
Travis Demsey – drums, backing vocals
Scott Owen – double bass, backing vocals

Recording process
 Producer – Lindsay Gravina 
 Engineer – Lindsay Gravina 
 Assistant engineer – Matt Voight 
 Mastering – Gavin Lurssen
 Mixing – Jerry Finn 
 Editing (digital) – Don C. Tyler
 Studios – Sing Sing Studios, Melbourne 
Mixing studios – Conway Studios, Los Angeles

Art works
 Cover art – Craig Preston
 Photography - Melanie Nissen

References

1998 singles
Songs about cities
The Living End songs
1998 songs
Modular Recordings singles
Songs written by Travis Demsey
Songs written by Chris Cheney